Iraota rochana, the scarce silverstreak, is a species of lycaenid or blue butterfly with several subspecies found in Manipur, Myanmar, Java, Borneo, Sumatra, Malaya, Langkawi, Thailand, Singapore, Sulawesi and the Philippines. The species was first described by Thomas Horsfield in 1829.

Subspecies
The subspecies of Iraota rochana found in India are:
 Iraota rochana boswelliana Distant, 1885 – Malayan scarce silverstreak blue

Gallery

References

Amblypodiini
Butterflies of Asia
Butterflies of Singapore
Butterflies of Borneo
Butterflies described in 1829